Castlemagner is a village and townland in the Duhallow area of north-west County Cork, Ireland. Castlemagner is within the Cork North-West (Dáil constituency).

History

Owned by a Richard Magner during the Irish Rebellion of 1641, the tower house was largely destroyed in the late 16th century. The lands surrounding Castle Magner were confiscated during the Cromwellian conquest of Ireland. The castle is largely in ruin, though the stair turret and parts of the surrounding bawn wall remain. 

Close to the castle is Saint Bridget's Church, a disused but largely extant Church of Ireland church. While the church itself was built in the early 19th century, the surrounding cemetery contains gravestones which are dated from the 18th century and earlier. A nearby holy well, also dedicated to Saint Bridget, is covered by a carved stone surround including an 18th century inscription and a carving, sometimes claimed to be a Sheela na gig.

Castlemagner's Roman Catholic church, which is dedicated to Saint Mary and was built c.1880, is located within the village itself. There is a shrine to Edel Quinn, a local lay missionary, within the church grounds.

Amenities
Castlemagner has a community centre building, a pub (the Castle Bar, known locally as Geoff's). The local Gaelic Athletic Association club, Castlemagner GAA, fields Gaelic football and hurling teams in the Duhallow division. The club won the Cork Junior B Hurling Championship in 2012.

References

Towns and villages in County Cork